Kabataş, formerly Karay, is a town and district of Ordu Province in the Black Sea region of Turkey. According to the 2000 census, population of the district is 20,644 of which 9,211 live in the town of Kabataş.

Formerly the village of Karay, Kabataş is in the Canik Mountains, 40 km inland from the Black Sea coast. The area was conquered by the Anatolian beylik of Hacı Emiroğulları in 1380.

Notes

References

External links
 District governor's official website 
 District municipality's official website 
 Road map of Kabataş and environs
 Various images of Kabataş and Belen, Ordu

Populated places in Ordu Province
Districts of Ordu Province